God-Apes and Fossil Men is a book on paleoanthropology in the  Indian Subcontinent by Kenneth A.R. Kennedy (Ann Arbor, 2000). The book is a detailed study of the history of Indian paleoanthropology and of the fossil record of prehistoric people of the Indian Subcontinent.

Contents
The fifth chapter is about the prehistoric God-Apes of the Siwalik hills. Other chapters describe the fossil hominids of the Pleistocene. The Mesolithic skeletal record is also described, and the last chapters treat the Harappan civilization and the Megalith builders.

References

External links 
Publisher announcement
Review by Lynne A. Schepartz

2000 non-fiction books
Biology books
Human evolution books